St. Ilija (Macedonian: Св. Илија), is a Macedonian Eastern Orthodox church named after the Prophet Elijah. It is located in Mississauga, Ontario, Canada.

History
The Macedonian Orthodox church parish in Mississauga was founded in 1979. The first church building was located on 290 Derry Rd West. In 1997 the parish relocated to its Streetsville location, restoring and converting a former art gallery into a church. In 2000 the church fell victim to an arson attack and a large portion of the building was destroyed. After raising funds from the local parish community, the decision came forth to build a new church. Foundations were laid on a new location on September 7, 2002, and was completed in 2004.

In the church there is a women's auxiliary, a church choir, a Macedonian language school with religious classes, a senior citizens club as well as a folk dance group. Within the lower level of the church building there is a banquet hall. St. Ilija participates in annual cultural city events such as "Carassauga". The church also owns "St. Ilija Macedonian Park", a  lot purchased for $350,000 CAD located near Derry Rd & Hurontario St in Mississauga.

See also
St. Clement of Ohrid Macedonian Orthodox Church, Toronto
St. Dimitrija Solunski Macedonian Orthodox Church, Markham, Ontario

External links
St. Ilija Macedonian Orthodox Church

Churches in Mississauga
Macedonian-Canadian culture
Macedonian Orthodox churches in Canada
Religious buildings and structures in Canada destroyed by arson